Karteres is a village and a community of the Lagkadas municipality. Before the 2011 local government reform it was part of the municipality of Lachanas, of which it was a municipal district. The 2011 census recorded 187 inhabitants in the village and 648 inhabitants in the community of Karteres. The community of Karteres covers an area of 83.719 km. The name Karteres or Karterai came up from its inhabitants were immigrants from Eastern Rumelia (Thracians) after the population exchange between Greece and Turkey events in 1923, also the name Karteres comes from the greek word Kartero (Καρτερώ, greek IPA /kaɾ.tɛˈɾɔ/) means that "I'm waiting" or ”I'm waiting for something unbearably", it's from the patience "the karteri" (το καρτέρι) of the inhabitants to come back to their ancestor's lands in Eastern Rumelia.2.

Administrative division
The community of Karteres consists of four separate settlements: 
Dorkada (population 372)
Karteres (population 187)
Mavrorrachi (population 31)
Stefania (population 58)

The aforementioned population figures are as of 2011.

See also
 List of settlements in the Thessaloniki regional unit

References

Populated places in Thessaloniki (regional unit)